Jung Myoung-sook (born 4 May 1975) is a South Korean taekwondo practitioner. 

She won a gold medal in heavyweight at the 1993 World Taekwondo Championships, and again gold medals at the 1995 and 1997 World Taekwondo Championships. She won a gold medal at the 1998 Asian Taekwondo Championships in Ho Chi Minh City and a gold medal at the 1998 Asian Taekwondo Championships in Bangkok.

References

External links

1975 births
Living people
South Korean female taekwondo practitioners
Taekwondo practitioners at the 1998 Asian Games
Asian Games medalists in taekwondo
Medalists at the 1998 Asian Games
Asian Games gold medalists for South Korea
World Taekwondo Championships medalists
Asian Taekwondo Championships medalists
20th-century South Korean women